P. indicus may refer to:
 Pangasius indicus, an extinct species of catfish
 Parapedobacter indicus, a species of bacterium in the family Sphingobacteriaceae
 Penaeus indicus, an Indian prawn species
 Phellodon indicus, a  species of tooth fungus
 Planonasus indicus, the pygmy false catshark, a species of ground shark
 Plocamopherus indicus, a species of sea slug
 Polyipnus indicus, a species of ray-finned fish
 Pontibacter indicus, a species of bacterium in the family Hymenobacteraceae
 Porphyrio indicus, a species of swamp hen
 Platycephalus indicus, the bartail flathead species
 Pterocarpus indicus, the Pashu Padauk, Malay Paduak or New Guinea rosewood, a plant species
 Pterocles indicus, the painted sandgrouse, a medium large bird species found in South Asia

Synonyms 
 Phyllodiscus indicus, a synonym of Triactis producta, a species of sea anemone
 Potamogeton indicus, a synonym of Aponogeton natans, a species of Cape-pondweed

See also
 Indicus (disambiguation)